Naugaon is a small town of approximately 5000 people in the Uttarkashi district of the Indian state of Uttarakhand. It's situated beside the Yamuna river. It lies at the junction of Naugaon-Purola Rd and National Highway 507 near the towns Barkot, Purola and Damta.

History
Naugon and its surrounding villages are collectively referred to as Dhakrai. The original 9 villages are Naugaon (गाँव), Sunara, Kotiyalgaon, Manjiyali, Tunalka, Bhatiya, Matiyali, Rastari and Mungra. The late Shri Daulat Ram Ranwalta and Pandit Dheema Nand Bijalwan brought Saraswati Shishu Mandir into town.

The Late Pandit Dheema Nand Bijalwan was one of the most famous astrologists of Yammuna valley. He was born in Murari and completed his education in Tehri. He established many government schools, colleges, and development offices in the area. As an orator, writer and social entrepreneur, he led social movements and universal  policy campaigns across the Himalayas.

Schools 
 Government inter college Naugaon
 Daulat ram ravanlta saraswati vidya mandir
 S.H.S.V.M. Naugaon
 Sasaswati shishu mandir 
 Basic school
 Bal vidya mandir
 Kanya junior high school MURARI
 Jagriti public school
 Dhanvantri public school
Yamuna valley public school

Healthcare        
Meenakshi medical store
 Community health centre
 Government veterinary hospital
 Chauhan medical store
Rana medical store

Villages in Naugaon

References 

Cities and towns in Uttarkashi district